The 1964 United States presidential election in Michigan took place on November 3, 1964, as part of the 1964 United States presidential election. Voters chose 21 representatives, or electors, to the Electoral College, who voted for president and vice president.

Michigan was won by incumbent President Lyndon B. Johnson (D–Texas), with 66.70% of the popular vote, against Senator Barry Goldwater (R–Arizona), with 33.10% of the popular vote. , this is the last election in which Livingston County, Allegan County, Antrim County, Grand Traverse County, Midland County, Ionia County, St. Joseph County, Barry County, Newaygo County, Hillsdale County, Emmet County, and Otsego County voted for the Democratic candidate. This is also the best Democratic performance in a presidential election in Michigan to date.

Results

Results by county

See also
 United States presidential elections in Michigan

References

Michigan
1964
1964 Michigan elections